Sighthounds, also called gazehounds,  are a type of dog, hounds that hunt primarily by sight and speed, rather than by scent and endurance as scent hounds do.

Appearance

These dogs specialize in pursuing prey, keeping it in sight, and overpowering it by their great speed and agility. They must be able to detect motion quickly, so they have keen vision. Sighthounds must be able to capture fast, agile prey such as deer and hares, so they have a very flexible back and long legs for a long stride, a deep chest to support an unusually (compared to other dogs) large heart, very efficient lungs for both anaerobic and aerobic sprints, and a lean, wiry body to keep their weight at a minimum. Sighthounds have unique anatomical and physiological features likely due to intentional selection for hunting by speed and sight; laboratory studies have established reference intervals for hematology and serum biochemical profiles in sighthounds, some of which are shared by all sighthounds and some of which may be unique to one breed.

The typical sighthound type has a light, lean head, which is dolichocephalic in proportion. This shape can create the illusion that their heads are longer than usual. Wolves and other wild dogs are dolichocephalic or mesaticephalic, but some domestic dogs have become brachycephalic (short-headed) due to artificial selection by humans over the course of 12,000 years. Dolichocephalic dogs have a wider field of vision but smaller overlap between the eyes and therefore possibly poorer depth perception in some of their field of view than brachycephalic dogs; most, if not all, dogs have less visual acuity than their antecedent the wolf. There is no science-based evidence to confirm the popular belief that sighthounds have a higher visual acuity than other types of dogs. However, there is increasing evidence that dolichocephalic dogs, thanks to a higher number of retinal ganglion cells in their “visual streak”, retain more heightened sensitivity than other dog types to objects and rapid movement in the horizontal field of vision.

Sighthounds such as the Saluki/Sloughi type (both named after the Seleucid Empire) may have existed for at least 5,000 years, with the earliest presumed sighthound remains of a male with a shoulder height around 54 cm, compared to a Saluki, appearing in the excavations of Tell Brak dated approximately 4,000 years before present.  The earliest complete European description of a sighthound and its work, the Celtic vertragus from Roman Spain of the 2nd century C.E., comes from Arrian's Cynegeticus. 
A similar type, possibly a moderately sized male sighthound, with a height of 61–63 cm, of approximately the same historic period, the Warmington Roman dog is described from a well-preserved skeleton found in England.
Although today most sighthounds are kept primarily as pets, some of them may have been bred for as many as thousands of years to detect movement of prey, then chase, capture, and kill it primarily by speed.  They thrive on physical activity. Some have mellow personalities, others are watchful or even hostile towards strangers, but the instinct to chase running animals remains strong.

Apart from coursing and hunting, various dog sports are practiced with purebred sighthounds, and sometimes with lurchers and longdogs. Such sports include racing, lure coursing, and other events.

List of sighthound breeds

 Afghan Hound
 Azawakh
 Borzoi
 Chippiparai
 Chortai
 Galgo Español
 Greyhound
 Irish Wolfhound
 Italian Greyhound
 Kaikadi
 Kanni
 Kombai
 Levriero Sardo
 Magyar agár
 Mudhol Hound
 Old Croatian Sighthound †
 Patagonian Greyhound
 Polish Greyhound
 Rajapalayam
 Rampur Greyhound
 Saluki 
 Scottish Deerhound
 Silken Windhound
 Sloughi
 Taigan
 Tazy
 Whippet
 Xigou

† extinct

Crossbreed sighthound types

 Kangaroo hound
 Longdog
 Lurcher
 American Staghound

Breeds considered to be controversial, not having by origin a sighthound function 
A number of breeds or types of dogs which do not hunt solely by speed and sight, as well as a number of non-hunting breeds, are currently being recognized as sighthounds, either formally or informally by kennel clubs, or lure and live coursing clubs. These include:

 Andalusian Hound
 Basenji
 Cirneco dell'Etna
 Ibizan Hound (Podenco Ibicenco)
 Peruvian Inca Orchid
 Pharaoh Hound (Kelb tal-fenek)
 Podenco Canario
 Portuguese Podengo
 Rhodesian Ridgeback
 Thai Ridgeback

Kennel club classification
When competing in conformation shows, most Anglophone kennel clubs, including the American Kennel Club and The Kennel Club (UK), group pedigree sighthound breeds together with scent hounds in a Hound Group, the Fédération Cynologique Internationale groups them in a dedicated Sighthound Group, whilst the United Kennel Club groups them in a Sighthound and Pariah Group.

See also

 Dog type
 Hound
 Hunting dog
 Scenthound

References

Further reading

 Almirall, Leon V. Canines and Coyotes. Caldwell, Id.: The Caxton Printers, Ltd., 1941.
 Anderson, John Kinlock. Hunting in the Ancient World. University of California Press 1985.
 Belkin, Dan. "The Functional Saluki: Lessons from the Coursing Field".  Field Advisory News, November/December 1993.
 Bengtson, Bo. "What IS a Sighthound?" Sighthound Review, charter Issue, May–June 1984.
 Bengtson, Bo. "What is a Sighthound?" Sighthound Review. January 2011.
 Bennett, D. & Timm, R.M., The dogs of Roman Vindolanda, Part IV: Large sighthounds and guard and utility dogs. Archaeofauna (30) 2021, 185-216 https://www.mdpi.com/2227-7080/9/4/74
 Brown, Curtis. Dog Locomotion and Gait Analysis. Wheat Ridge, Colo.: Hoflin Publishing, 1986.
 Burnham, Pat Gail. "Rhodesian Ridgebacks, and the Question of What Is a Sighthound?". Field Advisory News, March/April 1992.
 Copold, Steve. The Complete Book of Coursing: Hounds, Hares & Other Creatures, rev. and expanded 2nd ed. Wheat Ridge, Colo.: Hoflin Publishing, 1996.
 Copold, Steve. Hounds, Hares & Other Creatures: The Complete Book of Coursing (1st ed.). Arvada, Colo.: D. R. Hoflin, 1977 (1996).
 Couto Veterinary Consultants. "Are Sighthounds Really Dogs?"
 Cunliffe, Juliette. Popular Sight Hounds. London: Popular Dogs Publishing Co. Ltd., 1992. .
 Dansey, William. Arrian on Coursing: The Cynegeticus. London: J. Bohn, 1831
 Grant-Rennick, Richard (ed.). Coursing: The Pursuit of Game with Gazehounds. Saul, Gloucestershire: The Standfast Sporting Library, 1977. .
 Hancock, David. Sighthounds: Their Form, their Function and their Future. Ramsbury: The Crowood Press Ltd, 2012. .
 Hawkins, Richard. "What Is A Sighthound". Dogs in Canada, April 2006.
 Hawkins, Richard. "Sighthound Identity". The Performance Sighthound Journal, July–September 2007.
 Hull, Denison B. Hounds and Hunting in Ancient Greece. Chicago: University of Chicago Press 1964.
 Miller, Constance O. Gazehounds: The Search for Truth.  Wheat Ridge, Colo.: Hoflin Publishing, 1988.
 Parker, Heidi G. et al. "Genomic Analyses Reveal the Influence of Geographic Origin, Migration, and Hybridization on Modern Dog Breed Development". Cell Reports (#19) 697–708, 2017.
 Phillips, A. A., and M. M. Willcock, (eds.). Xenophon & Arrian on Hunting with Hounds. Oxford: Aris & Phillips, 1999. .
 Recum, Andreas F. von, Hunting with Hounds in North America. Gretna: Pelican Publishing Co. 2002. 
 Russell, Joanna. All about Gazehounds. London: Pelham, 1976. .
 M. H. Salmon ("Dutch"). Gazehounds & Coursing. St. Cloud, Minn.: North Star Press, 1977. .
 M. H. Salmon ("Dutch"). Gazehounds & Coursing: The History, Art, and Sport of Hunting with Sighthounds, Rev. and expanded 2nd ed. Silver City, N.M.: High-Lonesome Books, 1999. .
 Severtsov, A. S. Shubkina, A. V., Predator as a universal breeder. Science in Russia 2014 No. 5 (#203)
 Severtsov, A. S., Rosenzweig, M. L. and Shubkina, A. V., "Predators detect the welfare of their potential prey and cull those that are poorly". Evolutionary Ecology Research, 2017 18 (#5), pp. 555–569. 
 Suchanova, J. & Tovstucha, R. E., "Problems in translating the names of dog breeds from the perspective of different nomination principles & linguistic relativity". Coactivity: Philology, Educology 2016, 24 (#2): 113–121.
 Uhrikova, I. et al. "Haematological and biochemical variations among eight Sighthound breeds". Australian Veterinary Journal, Vol. 91 (#11), 2013. Summary by Dr. Dominique de Caprona.
 Wimmer, Barbara. Genetic Differences between Western bred Sighthound (FCI group 10) and Primitive breeds (FCI group 5). See summary by Dr. Dominique de Caprona

External links